Microbrotula is a genus of viviparous brotulas.

Species
There are currently eight recognized species in this genus:
 Microbrotula andersoni Schwarzhans & J. G. Nielsen, 2011
 Microbrotula bentleyi M. E. Anderson, 2005 (Many-ray cusk)
 Microbrotula geraldalleni Schwarzhans & J. G. Nielsen, 2012
 Microbrotula greenfieldi M. E. Anderson, 2007
 Microbrotula hamata Schwarzhans & J. G. Nielsen, 2011
 Microbrotula punicea M. E. Anderson, 2007
 Microbrotula queenslandica M. E. Anderson, 2005 (Queensland cusk)
 Microbrotula rubra Gosline, 1953

References

Bythitidae